Hasanabad (also Romanized as Ḩasanābād) is a village in Howmeh Rural District, in the Central District of Mahvelat County, Razavi Khorasan Province, Iran. As of the 2006 census, its population was 1,637, among 416 families.

References 

Populated places in Mahvelat County